Tango 3.0 is the third album by the electronic band Gotan Project. It was released in 2010 on ¡Ya Basta! Records under license from XL Recordings for the UK and US market, and Universal Music in the rest of the world.

Track listing
 "Tango Square" – 3:46
 "Rayuela" – 4:27
 "Desilusión" – 4:24
 "Peligro" – 3:57
 "La Gloria" –	3:47
 "Mil Millones" – 5:49
 "Tu Misterio" – 3:21 (featuring Daniel Melingo)
 "De Hombre a Hombre" – 3:25
 "El Mensajero" – 2:35
 "Panamericana" – 4:33
 "Érase Una Vez" – 4:20

Personnel (from the deluxe edition)
 Philippe Cohen Solal - electric guitar, bass, keyboards, whistle, dub FX 
 Eduardo Makaroff - acoustic and electric guitar
 Christoph H. Müller - bass, keyboards, tenori-on, vocoders, programming, dub FX 
 Cristina Vilallonga - vocals

Additional personnel
 Gustavo Beytelmann - piano.
 Nini Flores - bandoneon.
 Rodrigo Guerra - musical saw, mandolin.
 Dr. John - Hammond B3 organ (on "Tango Square").
 Line Kruse - violin.
 Franco Luciani - harmonica.
 Daniel Melingo - vocals and clarinet on "Tu Misterio".
 Victor Hugo Morales - soccer commentator (relator de fútbol) on "La Gloria".
 Rudi Flores - acoustic guitar
 Romain Lecuyer - double-bass
 Cecile Audebert - harp

Strings and horns arranged and conducted by Gustavo Beytelmann
 Cyril Garac (leader), Corine Auclin, Noelle Barbereau, Véronique Bohn, David Braccini, Michel Dietz, David Galoustov, Nicolas Gros, Philippe Huynh: violins
 Francoise Bordenave, Cécile Brossard, Sébastien Levy: violas
 Lionel Allemand, Etienne Samuel: cellos
 Cécile Audebert: harp
 Claude Egéa: trumpet
 Denis Leloup: trombone
 André Villeger, Rémi Sciuto: saxophones

Children's choir on Rayuela
 Emilia Fullana, María & Miguel Makaroff, Maylis & Noela Müller, Pablo Muñoz, Inés Salamanca, Maria Paulina Spucches, Mateo & Rafael Rodriguez

Children's choir directed by
 Sandra Rumolino

Technical personnel
 Gotan Project: production, composition, engineering and mixing (at Substudioz)
 Didier Pouydesseau: engineering (at Studio Acousti)
 Chris Finney: engineering for Dr. John (at The Music Shed)
 Laurent Jais: engineering for Daniel Melingo (at Studio Acousti)
 Greg Calbi: mastering (at Sterling Sound, New York)
 Benjamin Joubert: editing (at Translab, Paris)

Additional information
 All music composed by Gotan Project.
 Lyrics by Eduardo Makaroff on tracks 3, 6 & 7; 5, 7 & 16 by Sergio Makaroff on tracks 4 & 9, by Philippe Cohen Solal & Eduardo Makaroff on tracks 10 & 11, by Gotan Project on track 2 (deluxe edition)
 All tracks published by Science & Melodie Publishing
 "Rayuela" contains parts of readings by Julio Cortázar of his book "Rayuela" (from "Voz Viva de America Latina") and of "Preámbulo a las Instrucciones para dar Cuerda al Reloj", used by kind permission of Agencia Literaria Carmen Balcells, UNAM, La Casa de las Américas

Chart positions

Weekly charts

Year-end charts

Certifications

References 

2010 albums
Gotan Project albums
XL Recordings albums